Haikeguan railway station is a railway station located in Zhongzheng, Keelung, Taiwan. It is located on the Shen'ao line and is operated by the Taiwan Railways Administration. 

The station is the northernmost operational railway station in Taiwan. It is named after the nearby National Museum of Marine Science and Technology.

History
The station was opened on 9 January 2014

Around the station
 Badouzi Fishing Port
 National Museum of Marine Science and Technology

References

2014 establishments in Taiwan
Railway stations in Keelung
Railway stations opened in 2014
Railway stations served by Taiwan Railways Administration